WGRK-FM (105.7 MHz) is a country music–formatted radio station licensed to Greensburg, Kentucky, United States, and also serving Campbellsville, Kentucky. The station is owned by Forcht Broadcasting as part of a triopoly with Campbellsville–licensed rock music station WTCO (1450 AM) and Campbellsville-licensed CHR/Top 40 station WCKQ (104.1 FM). All three stations share studios on KY 323 (Friendship Pike Road) near US 68 on the southwest side of Campbellsville, while its transmitter facilities are located off Buckner Hill Road just west of Greensburg.

History
The station went on the air in 1977, as an FM companion to the local AM station WGRK (1540). The station initially broadcast at 103.1 FM. Owned by Mike Wilson, both stations simulcast the same format centered around a mix of rock and country music. In 1987, Wilson split the stations' programming, with the FM station focusing solely on country music, with the AM moving to a syndicated classic hits format. 

In 1988, WGRK-FM made a frequency change up to 105.7 MHz. The station would come to be acquired by Commonwealth Broadcasting, making it a sister station to Campbellsville's WTCO (1450 AM) and WCKQ (104.1 FM).  All three stations would be sold in 2014 to Forcht Broadcasting, owners of the WAIN stations in nearby Columbia, Kentucky. WGRK-AM would be excluded and shut down in 2018.

Programming
WGRK-FM airs several local programs on weekdays as part of its country music format. The station broadcasts a morning show hosted by Sid Montana under the title Your Morning Cup from 6–10 a.m. WGRK also features two afternoon shows: Cha from 1–3 and Catfish Hunter from 3 p.m. onwards. Additionally, an one-hour all request program airs at Noon.

References

External links

GRK-FMu
Country radio stations in the United States
1977 establishments in Kentucky
Radio stations established in 1977
Greensburg, Kentucky